is a district located in Shiribeshi Subprefecture, Hokkaido, Japan.

As of 2004, the district has an estimated population of 2,947 and a density of 12.37 persons per km2. The total area is 238.20 km2.

Towns and villages in the area include Shakotan.

Geography and climate
Shakotan District is a peninsula located on the southwestern coast of Hokkaido. The district borders the city of Otaru in the Shiribeshi District to the east and is approximately forty miles from the prefectural capital Sapporo. Shakotan District is characterized by steep mountains as high as 1,300m interspersed with flatlands suitable to farming.  Small streams flow down from the mountains feeding small wetlands and ponds.

Shakotan District has a humid continental climate.  As with much of Hokkaido, the temperature of the district varies widely, from mild, humid summers to snowy winters.

Economy
The district's economy is dominated by rural farming, commercial fishing, and to a lesser extent, local tourism.  Shakotan village is known for its strong sea urchin fishery, although in recent years the government has had to limit public overfishing of urchins. Tourists mainly from Sapporo come to the district for hiking, fishing, and the peninsula's scenery.

Districts in Hokkaido